The Department of Customer Service is a department of the New South Wales Government that functions as a service provider to support sustainable government finances, major public works and maintenance programs, government procurement, information and communications technology, corporate and shared services, consumer protection, and land and property administration of the government in New South Wales, Australia.

The department was established with effect from 1 July 2019 and assumed most functions from the preceding Department of Finance, Service and Innovation, as well as a number of functions from other department functions and several agencies.

Structure
The Department is the lead agency in the Customer Service cluster, led by Secretary, presently Emma Hogan, who reports to the ministers listed below.

Ministers
The following ministers are responsible for the administration of the department and its agencies:

 Minister for Customer Service and Digital Government, presently The Hon. Victor Dominello 
 Minister for Small Business and the Minister for Fair Trading, presently The Hon. Eleni Petinos .

Ultimately, the ministers are responsible to the Parliament of New South Wales.

Agencies
The following agencies are included in the Customer Service cluster, administered by the Department: 

 Architects Registration Board
 Behavioural Insights Unit
 Board of Surveying and Spatial Information
 Building Professionals Board
 Cyber Security NSW
 Data Analytics Centre
 Geographical Names Board of New South Wales
 Greyhound Welfare and Integrity Commission
 Information and Privacy Commission NSW
 Innovation NSW
 Liquor & Gaming NSW
 NSW Fair Trading
 NSW Registry of Births, Deaths and Marriages
 NSW Telco Authority
 Office of the Registrar General (to monitor and enforce performance of the NSW Land Registry Services)
 Professional Standards Authority
 Revenue NSW
 SafeWork NSW
 Service NSW
 State Insurance Regulatory Authority (SIRA)
 Subsidence Advisory NSW
 Waste Assets Management Corporation

Priorities

History

The department was established with effect from 1 July 2019 and assumed most of the functions of the former Department of Finance, Services and Innovation that was dissolved on the same date, as well as some functions from the New South Wales Treasury and the Department of Premier and Cabinet. The department also incorporated Liquor & Gaming NSW, the Data Analytics Centre, and the NSW Registry of Births, Deaths and Marriages.

See also

List of New South Wales government agencies

References

External links

Service NSW website

Customer Service
2019 establishments in Australia
Economy of New South Wales